Acorn, Arkansas is an unincorporated community and census-designated place (CDP) in Polk County, Arkansas, United States, approximately 6 miles north of Mena. The town is located at the junction of U.S. Route 59, U.S. Route 71 and U.S. Route 270 in the northern part of the county.  Though Acorn is only a three-way junction, it marks the end of three separate U.S. highway concurrencies:  U.S. 59 & 71 from Texarkana, U.S. 59 & 270 from Heavener, Oklahoma, and U.S. 71 & 270 from "Y" City.

It was first listed as a CDP in the 2020 census with a population of 376.

Education
It is home to the Acorn branch of the Ouachita River School District, including Acorn Elementary School and Acorn High School.

The Ouachita River district was established by the merger of the Acorn School District and the Oden School District on July 1, 2004.

Demographics

2020 census

Note: the US Census treats Hispanic/Latino as an ethnic category. This table excludes Latinos from the racial categories and assigns them to a separate category. Hispanics/Latinos can be of any race.

References

External links
 Arkansas Native Plant and Wildlife Center

Unincorporated communities in Polk County, Arkansas
Unincorporated communities in Arkansas
Census-designated places in Polk County, Arkansas
Census-designated places in Arkansas